Yinjifu is a town in Fang County, Hubei province, China. To promote tourism, the town was named after Yin Jifu, a Chinese minister of the Zhou dynasty, who assisted King Xuan of Zhou in military campaigns against the Xianyun. The town was established in March 2012, following the an administrative reshuffling, and administers eight villages. As of 2019, Yinjifu has a hukou population of 10,165.

Administrative divisions 
, Yinjifu administers the following eight villages:
Langkou Village
Shenjiawan Village
Langyu Village
Yudidian Village
Shuangwan Village
Qixingou Village
Zhucangdong Village
Tangjiagou Village

Demographics 
As of 2019, Yinjifu has a hukou population of 10,165, down slightly from 10,236 in 2018.

Yinjifu's predecessor, Langkou Township had a population of 7,261 in the 2010 Chinese Census, down from 11,175 in the 2000 Chinese Census.

References

Township-level divisions of Hubei
Fang County